A gown is a loose outer garment by men and women from the early Middle Ages to the seventeenth century, or any woman's garment consisting of a bodice and attached skirt. 

Gown may also refer to:

Clothing 
Evening gown, women's formal attire
Dressing gown, British term for a bathrobe
Mandarin gown, Cheongsam
Suicide gown, anti-suicide smock
Cap and gown, graduation attire
Wedding dress, bridal attire
Patient gown, clothing worn by patients in hospitals
Medical gown, clothing worn by medical professionals
Gowning, putting on a cleanroom suit

Other uses 
The Gown, a Belfast-based student newspaper

See also  
 
McGown (disambiguation)